The Ibitipoca State Park is a forested state park is the state of Minas Gerais, Brazil.

Location

It was created on 4 July 1973 and is administered by the Instituto Estadual de Florestas of Minas Gerais.
It is in the municipality of Lima Duarte.

Entry to the park is charged and is limited to 300 visitors per day during the week and 800 at weekends and on holidays. Camping is permitted in the park but this is also limited to a certain number of visitors and only in the designated site. The camp site has a restaurant, café and lavatories.

Toponym 
"Ibitipoca" derives from the Tupi and signifies "burst mountain, from the terms ybytyra ("mountain") e pok ("burst").

Climate and vegetation 
The climate is humid subtropical, with mild rainy summers and dry winters. The park is on an outcrop of quartzite with a shallow soil (Cambisol) layer made up principally of organic material and sand formed by the erosion of the rock. Because of this a large part of the vegetation is Xerophyte, comprising true grasses and low growing herbaceous plants. In the regions where the soil is shallow are bushes, cactuses and bromeliads characteristic of rocky places. The rivers of the park are caramel coloured because of high levels of organic material.

Attractions 
The main attractions are the caves, mountains and waterfalls.

Some tourist spots are the Janela do Céu, Cachoeirinha, Pico do Pião, Cruzeiro, Lago dos Espelhos, Cachoeira dos Macacos and Cachoeira da Pedra Quadrada.

Pico da Lombada has an interesting characteristic: The view from there to the horizon is 360°—one can see to the horizon in whichever direction as no mountain stands in the way.

Access 
Part of the track is by dirt road but its steepest stretch between the Fazenda do Engenho and the village is paved as it is in other places. from the village to the park is a further  on paved road. In the rainy season this access can be difficult due to poor maintenance of the road.

External links 
 Official tourist site
 Photographs of the park

References 

State parks of Brazil
Protected areas of Minas Gerais
Protected areas established in 1973
1973 establishments in Brazil